This is a list of peer-reviewed scientific journals published in the field of Mathematical Physics.

Advances in Theoretical and Mathematical Physics
Annales Henri Poincaré
Communications in Mathematical Physics
International Journal of Geometric Methods in Modern Physics
Journal of Geometry and Physics
Journal of Mathematical Physics
Journal of Nonlinear Mathematical Physics
Journal of Physics A: Mathematical and Theoretical
Journal of Statistical Physics
Letters in Mathematical Physics
Reports on Mathematical Physics
Reviews in Mathematical Physics
International Journal of Physics and Mathematics
SIGMA (Symmetry, Integrability and Geometry: Methods and Applications)
Teoreticheskaya i Matematicheskaya Fizika (Theoretical and Mathematical Physics), Steklov Mathematical Institute

References

See also 
 List of mathematics journals
 List of physics journals
 List of scientific journals
 List of statistics journals

Lists of academic journals
Physics-related lists